Joe Hill may refer to:
 Joe Hill (activist) (18791915),  Swedish-American labor activist and songwriter
 Joe Hills (18971969), English cricketer and umpire
 Joe Hill (alias of Joseph Graves Olney, 18491884), American rancher and outlaw
 Blind Joe Hill (19371998), American blues singer, guitarist, harmonica player and drummer
 Joseph Hill ( Dusty Hill) (1949–2021), American bassist associated with the band ZZ Top
 Joe Hill (novelist) (born 1972), pen name of American author Joseph Hillstrom King, son of author Stephen King
 Joe Hills (American football) (born 1987), American football wide receiver
 Joe Hill, fictional character on the TV series Blue Bloods
 Jo Hill (born 1973), Australian women's basketball player
 Joe Hill (journalist), Australian television presenter associated with station ADS

Eponyms of the activist 
 Joe Hill (film), 1971 biopic of Joe Hill the activist and songwriter
 "Joe Hill" (song), a song written by Alfred Hayes and Earl Robinson and recorded by Joan Baez for her 1970 album One Day at a Time
 Joe Hill (opera), by Alan Bush and Barrie Stavis, first performed in 1970
 Joe Hill House, Catholic Worker Movement house of hospitality in Salt Lake City, Utah which operated 19611968
 Joe Hill Award, awarded annually since 1989 by the Labor Heritage Foundation for a body of work in the field of labor culture
 see also: Joe Hill §Influence and tributes

See also 
 Joseph Hill (disambiguation)